Osipovo is a rural locality (a village) in Megrinskoye Rural Settlement, Chagodoshchensky District, Vologda Oblast, Russia. The population was 1 as of 2002.

Geography 
Osipovo is located km northeast of Chagoda (the district's administrative centre) by road. Niz is the nearest rural locality.

References 

Rural localities in Chagodoshchensky District